Simoa is the name of a river which flows through the municipalities of  Sigdal and Modum in Buskerud County, Norway.

Location
The Simoa river runs from Lake Soneren through the municipality of Sigdal in a south-easterly course until it flows into Drammenselva at Åmot in  Modum. The river begins a few miles north of Lake Haglebuvatna  where it is initially known as the Haglebu, later becoming the Eggedøla as it flows through the valley of Eggedal.

Haugfoss waterfall at Blaafarveværket in Modum, has been used as a motif for many artists throughout history. Notable examples include Winter at Simoa River which was painted during 1883 by Norwegian artist Frits Thaulow.

It was developed for hydroelectric power by Midt Nett Buskerud AS, the utility company owned by Modum and Sigdal municipalities.   Haugfoss kraftverk was constructed in 1937 and has a capacity of 3.6 MW. Horga, the tributary river which runs into Soneren has Horga kraftverk, a second power station  which was built 1988–1990 and has a capacity of 7.2 MW.

Among the floods in the Simoa which have caused damage, are those in 1752, 1858, 1934, 1938, 1987, 1995, 2007, and 2008. Attempts are made to regulate the reservoirs to reduce the risk of flooding. Parts of Simoa was protected in the Conservation Plan for the river (1973). The river is protected upstream from Lake Soneren.

The former name for the river was Sigm(á),  meaning "glide" and å meaning "river".

References

Other sources
"Simoa", Store norske leksikon

External links
Midt Nett Buskerud AS

Rivers of Viken
Modum
Sigdal
Rivers of Norway